Ha Tae-gyu (born 20 December 1989) is a South Korean fencer. He won the gold medal in the men's team foil event at the 2018 Asian Games held in Jakarta, Indonesia. He also competed in the men's individual foil event.

In 2017, he competed in fencing at the Summer Universiade held in Taipei, Taiwan. In 2018, he competed in the men's foil event at the World Fencing Championships held in Wuxi, China.

References

External links 
 

Living people
1989 births
Place of birth missing (living people)
South Korean male foil fencers
Asian Games gold medalists for South Korea
Asian Games bronze medalists for South Korea
Asian Games medalists in fencing
Fencers at the 2010 Asian Games
Fencers at the 2018 Asian Games
Medalists at the 2010 Asian Games
Medalists at the 2018 Asian Games
Competitors at the 2017 Summer Universiade
Left-handed fencers